is a railway station in  Hamakita-ku, Hamamatsu,  Shizuoka Prefecture, Japan, operated by the private railway company, Enshū Railway.

Lines
Misono Chūōkōen Station is a station on the  Enshū Railway Line and is 12.0 kilometers from the starting point of the line at Shin-Hamamatsu Station.

Station layout
The station has a one side platform, serving a single bi-directional track. The station building has automated ticket machines, and automated turnstiles which accept the NicePass smart card, as well as ET Card, a magnetic card ticketing system. The station is unattended.

Adjacent stations

|-
!colspan=5|Enshū Railway

Station History
Misono Chūōkōen Station was established on April 1, 1951 as the original Hamakita Station It was renamed  in August 1977, and given its present name in August 2007.

Passenger statistics
In fiscal 2017, the station was used by an average of 1,110 passengers daily (boarding passengers only).

Surrounding area
Hamakita Junior High School
 Misono Central Park

See also
 List of railway stations in Japan

References

External links

 Enshū Railway official website

Railway stations in Japan opened in 1951
Railway stations in Shizuoka Prefecture
Railway stations in Hamamatsu
Stations of Enshū Railway